Cyrus Highsmith (born 1973) is an American typeface designer, illustrator, and author.

After graduating from the Rhode Island School of Design in 1997, he worked at Font Bureau in Boston as Senior Type Designer until founding his own type foundry, Occupant Fonts, in 2016, distributing alongside his former employers via the Type Network service.

Some of Highsmith’s most well-known typefaces are Zócalo, used by the Mexican daily El Universal, and the Antenna series, which was used in several magazine designs as well as by Ford and the official Star Wars website. Other clients for custom fonts include or have included The Wall Street Journal, Martha Stewart Living, La Prensa Gráfica of El Salvador, ESPN, and Men’s Health. His typefaces Prensa and Relay won the 2001 Bukvaːraz! award, organized by ATypI (the International Typographic Association) in 2001. In 2015, Cyrus Highsmith received the Gerrit Noordzij Prize by the Royal Academy of Art, The Hague.

In addition to typeface design, Highsmith has been teaching at his alma mater, the Rhode Island School of Design, since 2000, while also lecturing and taking part in juries in North America, Japan and across Europe. He is the author of Inside Paragraphs: Typographic Fundamentals published by Font Bureau in 2012. With his own imprint, Occupant Press, he publishes children’s books and other prints. In 2016, Highsmith founded Occupant Fonts in Providence, Rhode Island, which continues to publish his typefaces designed while at Font Bureau as well as new releases.

In September 2017, it was announced that Occupant Fonts had been acquired by the Japanese type foundry   and thenceforth functioned as their Providence drawing office, with Highsmith as its creative director, overseeing RISD graduates June Shin, Marie Otsuka and Cem Eskinazi. The first two releases in cooperation with Morisawa are Citrine and the Latin-character range of A1 Gothic (both derived from his typeface Allium), published that same year.

List of typefaces

Books

Text and illustrations 
 Highsmith, Cyrus, & Occupant Fonts staff. How to Speak Rooster. Providence (Rhode Island): Occupant Fonts, 2018. 
 Inside Paragraphs: Typographic Fundamentals (Revised Edition). Princeton Architectural Press, 2020. 
 Apple Bear Cat. Providence (Rhode Island): Occupant Press, 2013.
 Inside Paragraphs: Typographic Fundamentals. Boston: Font Bureau, 2012.

Illustrations/Picture book 
  Ari Inu Usagi (Ant, Dog, Rabbit – a Japanese alphabet book). Tokyo): Bunkeido, 2016.   https://common.bunkei.co.jp/books/2991.html
  Ikko Ni-hon San-biki (One Apple, Two Tulips, Three Rabbits — a book of Japanese counter words). Tokyo: Bunkeido, 2017.  https://common.bunkei.co.jp/books/2955.html
  Apple Bear Cat (' — a book of ABC words). Tokyo: Bunkeido, 2014.  https://common.bunkei.co.jp/books/3062.html

About 
 KABK, ed. Products of a Thinking Hand (Gerrit Noordzij Prize exhibition book). The Hague: Uitgeverij de Buitenkant, 2018.

References

External links 
 Inside Paragraphs on Good Reads
 http://www.unostiposduros.com/cyrus-highsmith-sobre-sus-clases-de-tipografia/
 Highsmith at the Klingspor Museum website
 http://luc.devroye.org/showcase-cyrushighsmith/ Cyrus Highsmith’s typefaces
 https://www.youtube.com/watch?v=d7Hs3qJ3hJM Highsmith’s sketchbook

American illustrators
1973 births
Living people
Rhode Island School of Design alumni
Artists from Milwaukee
American typographers and type designers